Arthur Rowley (born 1870; date of death unknown) was an English footballer who played in the Football League for Burslem Port Vale and Stoke, and in the Southern League with Bristol Rovers. He was the first player to score a goal straight from a direct free kick in the Football League.

Career
Rowley played for Leek, Distillery, and the North Staffordshire Regiment, before joining Stoke in 1896. He became a useful addition to the Stoke squad, taking over the right half position from the ageing Davy Brodie. He played four First Division games in the 1896–97 season, before becoming a first team regular in the 1897–98 and 1898–99 campaigns. He spent three seasons at the Victoria Ground, making 62 appearances.

He played for Bristol Rovers in the Southern League before joining Burslem Port Vale in September 1902. He played 27 league games in the 1902–03 season, as Vale posted a ninth-place finish in the Second Division. He became the first player to score a goal straight from a direct free kick in the Football League on 7 September 1903, in a 3–2 defeat to Bolton Wanderers at the Athletic Ground. He claimed two goals in 38 games in the 1903–04 campaign, but left the club before the start of the 1904–05 season.

Career statistics
Source:

References

1870 births
Year of death missing
Sportspeople from Leek, Staffordshire
English footballers
Association football midfielders
North Staffordshire Regiment soldiers
Stoke City F.C. players
Bristol Rovers F.C. players
Port Vale F.C. players
English Football League players
Southern Football League players
19th-century British Army personnel
Military personnel from Staffordshire